Veerabhadran "Ram" Ramanathan  (born 24 November 1944) is Edward A. Frieman Endowed Presidential Chair in Climate Sustainability  Scripps Institution of Oceanography, University of California, San Diego. He has contributed to many areas of the atmospheric and climate sciences including developments to general circulation models, atmospheric chemistry, and radiative transfer. He has been a part of major projects such as the Indian Ocean Experiment (INDOEX) and the Earth Radiation Budget Experiment (ERBE), and is known for his contributions to the areas of climate physics, Climate Change and atmospheric aerosols research. He is now the Chair of Bending the Curve: Climate Change Solutions education project of University of California. He has received numerous awards, and is a member of the US National Academy of Sciences. He has spoken about the topic of global warming, and written that "the effect of greenhouse gases on global warming is, in my opinion, the most important environmental issue facing the world today."

Due to his close affiliation with Pope Francis, Ramanathan has been described as "The Pope's climate scientist". He was influential in the creation of Laudato si', the Pope's encyclical on climate change.

Background and education
Ramanathan was born in Chennai, India. At the age of 11, he moved with his family to Bangalore. The classes at the school he attended were taught in English, and not his native Tamil. He admits that he "lost the habit of listening to my teachers and had to figure out things on my own". He received his BE degree from Annamalai University, and ME degree from the Indian Institute of Science. In 1970, he arrived in the US to study interferometry at the State University of New York at Stony Brook under the direction of Robert Cess. Before Ramanathan could begin working on his PhD research, Cess decided to change his research and focus on planetary atmospheres.

Research and publications

Ramanathan has contributed to many areas of the atmospheric sciences. His first major findings were in the mid-1970s and were related to the greenhouse effect of CFCs and other trace gases Until that time, carbon dioxide was thought to be the sole greenhouse gas responsible for global warming. He also contributed to the early development of global circulation models and the detecting and attribution of climate change.

His focus then shifted to the radiative effects of clouds on the climate. This was done using the Earth Radiation Budget Experiment (ERBE), which showed that clouds have a large cooling effect on the planet. ERBE was also able to measure the greenhouse effect without the use of climate models.

Recently, he has published on the aerosol radiative properties. His work has shown that aerosols have a cooling effect on the surface of the planet, and at the top of the atmosphere, but the forcing at the top of the atmosphere was only one-third the magnitude as the surface forcing. This has implications for the hydrologic cycle. While working on the Central Equatorial Pacific Experiment, he discovered that absorbing black carbonaceous aerosols have a larger influence on climate than previously thought, which led to the development of the Indian Ocean Experiment (INDOEX). In the 1990s, he led the Indian Ocean Experiment with Paul Crutzen and discovered the widespread existence of atmospheric brown clouds covering much of the Indian Ocean region. They found that the vast majority of the aerosols were anthropogenic in origin, and that the surface cooling caused by the aerosols is more important than the atmospheric heating. These atmospheric brown clouds may have masked as much as 50% of the surface heating caused by the increase in carbon dioxide, and caused reduced precipitation during the Indian monsoon.

Ramanathan is also interested in the impact of climate change on agriculture in India. While atmospheric brown clouds partially offset the warming due from carbon dioxide, their effect on agriculture has been less certain. A statistical rice model couple to a regional climate model has shown that reductions of both carbon dioxide and atmospheric brown clouds will increase crop yield.

He has also written on avoiding dangerous anthropogenic climate change. Ramanathan writes that there are several tipping points in the climate system, and that they do not all occur at the same temperature threshold; the tipping point for the arctic summer sea ice is likely to be smaller than that for the West Antarctic Ice Sheet. While the planet has seen an observed warming of 0.6 °C since pre-industrial times, it has already most likely committed itself to 2.4 °C (1.4 °C to 4.3 °C) of warming. These values surpass several of the tipping point thresholds. In a 2014 paper, Ramanathan and co-authors suggested that mitigating methane, soot, ozone and hydrofluorocarbons in the atmosphere could reduce the expected sea level rise due to climate change.

Project Surya
In March 2007, Ramanathan wrote a white paper with Balakrishnan on a potential project that will reduce air pollution and global warming. Project Surya, which means Sun in Sanskrit, will use inexpensive solar cookers in rural India, and document the reductions in carbon dioxide and soot emissions. The byproducts of biofuel cooking and biomass burning are significant contributors to global warming, and the expanded use of renewable energy is expected to decrease their effects.

The burning of solid fuels causes substantial health risks as well. An estimated 440,000 deaths per year are attributed to unsanitary food preparation techniques due to aerosol exposure. Over 3 billion people cook and heat their home by burning biomass such as wood and feces. The project, costing an estimated $4.5 million, will buy 3,500 cookers and impact up to 15,000 people. As of November 2008, the project has not been funded.

Project Surya was soft launched in March 2009. Each household in the village of Khairatpur, Uttar Pradesh received a biomass cook stoves and a solar lamp. Surya has since received $150,000 in funding from UNEP.

Honors and awards
Ramanathan is an ISI highly cited researcher. He is a fellow of the American Association for the Advancement of Science, American Meteorological Society and American Geophysical Union. He became a member of the American Academy of Arts and Sciences in 1995. In 1995, the Royal Netherlands Academy of Arts and Sciences awarded him the Buys Ballot Medal. In 2002, he was awarded the Carl-Gustaf Rossby Research Medal, "... for fundamental insights into the radiative roles of clouds, aerosols and key gases in the Earth's climate system." He was elected a member of the US National Academy of Sciences in 2002 "... for fundamental contributions to our modern understanding of global climate change and human impacts on climate and environment", an Academician of the Pontifical Academy of Sciences in 2004, a member the American Philosophical Society in 2006, and a member of the Royal Swedish Academy of Sciences in 2008.
Also, Veerabhadran Ramanathan has been bestowed with the BBVA Foundation Frontiers of Knowledge Award 2015 in the Climate Change category for discovering that human-produced gases and pollutants other than  have a huge power to alter the Earth's climate, and that by acting on them it is possible to make a short-term dent on the rate of global warming. He received the prestigious Tang Prize for Sustainable Development in 2018. He was awarded the 90th annual Mendel Medal by Villanova University in 2018 for his work on climate change. Ramanathan is the recipient of the Lifetime Achievement Award (Champions of the Earth) in 2013.

Articles
Why Black Carbon and Ozone Also Matter, in September/October 2009 Foreign Affairs with Veerabhadran Ramanathan and Jessica Seddon Wallack.
The Climate Threat We Can Beat, in May/June 2012 Foreign Affairs with David G. Victor, Charles F. Kennel, Veerabhadran Ramanathan (website is paid while article is current)

References

External links

 Prof. V. (Ram) Ramanathan
 Biography of Veerabhadran Ramanathan
 Testimonial to the House Committee on Oversight and Government Reform
 Project Surya

Members of the United States National Academy of Sciences
Indian climatologists
Members of the Pontifical Academy of Sciences
Members of the Royal Swedish Academy of Sciences
Living people
Scientists from Madurai
Scripps Institution of Oceanography faculty
Recipients of the Buys Ballot Medal (Netherlands)
Annamalai University alumni
Fellows of the American Geophysical Union
Carl-Gustaf Rossby Research Medal recipients
Atmospheric chemists
1944 births
Indian Institute of Science alumni
20th-century Indian chemists
20th-century Indian earth scientists
20th-century Indian physicists
Tamil scientists
American academics of Indian descent
Scientists from Tamil Nadu
Indian fluid dynamicists
American people of Indian Tamil descent
Fellows of the American Academy of Arts and Sciences
Members of the American Philosophical Society